MARTa Herford is a contemporary art museum in Herford, Germany.

Building and history 

The idea for the museum formed in 2000, drawing from Herford's status as a German center of furniture and home furnishing production. The name MARTa is an acronym for Möbel (German for furniture), ART (simply art in English), and Ambiente (ambience). The founding director of the museum was Jan Hoet, a noted Belgian curator.  took over as director in 2009.

The building was designed by Frank Gehry and built by Archimedes GmbH. Construction began in 2001, and it officially opened to the public on May 7, 2005.

Images

References

External links 

 

Herford (district)
Frank Gehry buildings
Art museums and galleries in Germany
Modern art museums
2005 establishments in Germany
Art museums established in 2005